A treason trial is a criminal trial. It may refer to:

List

See also
List of people convicted of treason

References

Further reading